Paloma Varga Weisz (born 1966) is a contemporary artist living in Germany, best known for her sculptures and drawings. In 2012, six of her drawings were acquired by and exhibited in the Museum of Modern Art. She lives and works in Düsseldorf.

Life
Paloma Varga Weisz was trained as a woodcarver from 1987–90 in Garmisch-Partenkirchen. From 1990 to 1998 she studied at the Staatliche Kunstakademie Düsseldorf under Tony Cragg and Gerhard Merz. Her multifaceted practice includes sculptures and installations mainly in wood and ceramics, as well as watercolors and drawings. Angela Stief, a curator at the Kunsthalle Wien, has said of her work: "Paloma Varga Weisz’ sculptural oeuvre, characterized by obvious references to traditional iconography and handcraft, joins the historical with a contemporary artistic practice that only rarely reveals its genealogical roots."

Awards and scholarships
2017: Holbach-Award, Stiftung zur Förderung der Kunst in der Pfalz
2007: Marianne-Werefkin-Preis, Berlin
2000/2001: Bremerhavenstipendium, Bremerhaven

Notes and references

Further reading 
Paloma Varga Weisz. Root of a Dream. Castello di Rivoli, Museum of Contemporary Art, Rivoli, Mousse Publishing, Milano 2017. 
Maison de Plaisance: Rosemarie Trockel und Paloma Varga Weisz. Museum Morsbroich Leverkusen, Verlag für Moderne Kunst, 2012, Nürnberg. 
Neues Rheinland - die postironische Generation. Distanz Verlag, 2010, Berlin. 
A million miles from home. Folkestone Triennale, Cultureshock Media, 2011. 
Paloma Varga Weisz, Gilded Age. A Tale of Today. Katalog Kunsthalle Wien. Verlag für moderne Kunst, 2008, Nürnberg. 
Paloma Varga Weisz, Zeichnungen. Koenig Books, 2005, London. 
Raumfürraum. Katalog Kunsthalle Düsseldorf, Kunstverein für die Rheinlande und Westfalen. Verlag der Buchhandlung Walther König, 2005, Köln. 
Most Wanted: The Olbricht Collection. Verlag der Buchhandlung Walther König, 2005, Köln
Interviews 2.  Gerald Matt, Kunsthalle Wien, 2008. 
Of Mice and Men. 4. Berlin Biennale, 2005, Hatje Cantz. 
Sammlung Kunst der Gegenwart in K 21 Kunstsammlung Nordrhein-Westfalen. 2005, Düsseldorf, 
Paloma Varga Weisz. Katalog Museum Kurhaus Kleve. Revolver, Archiv für Aktuelle Kunst, 2004.  u. 
Paloma Varga Weisz. Sammlung Ackermans, 1999, Xanten

External links
Official website

Living people
1966 births
German contemporary artists